All That Remains are an American metal band from Springfield, Massachusetts, formed in 1998. They have released nine studio albums, a live CD/DVD, and have sold nearly a million records worldwide.

Albums

Studio albums

Notes

Live albums

Demos

Singles

Music videos

References

Heavy metal group discographies
Discographies of American artists